FK Haniska is a Slovak football team, based in the town of Haniska. The club was founded in 1991.

Notable players 
Had international caps for their respective countries. Players whose name is listed in bold represented their countries and playing for FK.

 Jaroslav Kolbas
 Robert Cicman

External links 
official club website

References

Haniska
Association football clubs established in 1991
1991 establishments in Slovakia